Byron Black and Jonathan Stark were the defending champions but did not compete that year.

Mike Bauer and David Rikl won in the final 7–6, 6–4 against Alex Antonitsch and Greg Rusedski.

Seeds

  John Fitzgerald /  Mark Woodforde (quarterfinals)
  Scott Davis /  Sandon Stolle (semifinals)
  Mike Bauer /  David Rikl (champions)
  Shelby Cannon /  Jim Pugh (first round)

Draw

External links
 1994 CA-TennisTrophy Doubles draw

Doubles